John Kenneth Jamieson (Medicine Hat, Alberta 28 Aug 1910-September 26, 1999) served as the chief executive officer of Exxon from 1969 to 1975.

Biography
He was born in Medicine Hat, Alberta and graduated from Massachusetts Institute of Technology in 1931.

Honors
In 1975, Jamieson received the Golden Plate Award of the American Academy of Achievement.

References

1910 births
Canadian business executives
Year of death missing
Canadian expatriates in the United States